Lazaros Lamprou (born 19 December 1997) is a Greek professional footballer who plays as a winger for Eredivisie club Excelsior.

Career

Panathinaikos
On 13 March 2014, three years after he joined the U-17 team, Lamprou, along with nine other players, signed his first professional contract with Panathinaikos. In 2014, was the only Greek player to feature on a list entitled “TOP 40 young talent in world football – born in 1997″ by The Guardian.

On 28 October 2015, he made his first team debut, in a 3–0 home defeat against Levadiakos for the Greek Cup.

Iraklis
On 5 September 2016, After having refused to sign a new contract with Panathinaikos, Lamprou agreed to sign a two-year contract with Iraklis. His first appearance and his first goal in Iraklis' shirt came in a Super League Greece match against AEL, on 12 September 2016.

PAOK
On 29 December 2016, PAOK announced the signing of Lamprou from Iraklis for a 3.5-year contract on an amount of €300,000 and that he would play for Panionios on loan for the rest of the season. On 20 July 2017, on the second leg of the second qualifying round of Europa League, he scored his first goal with Panionios giving a two goal lead against Gorica in a glorious 3–2 away win. On 7 February 2018, Lamprou as a substitute, scored with a brilliant deft lob in the final stages, securing Panionios’ 5–1 aggregate win over Lamia and qualification for the Greek Cup semi-final stage. It was the first time since 2000 that the club reached the semi-finals. Three days later, he scored again with a penalty kick sealing a 1–0 home win against Lamia for the Super League.

On 31 August 2018, Lamprou joined Eredivisie club Fortuna Sittard on loan until the summer of 2019. On 21 October 2018, he scored a brace sealing a 3–1 home win game against De Graafschap and was voted as the MVP of the game.
On 9 February 2019, he gave the lead to his club in a home game against Excelsior, and scored another 20 minutes later sealing a 4–1 home win. On 23 February 2019, he opened the score after an assist from Calvin Mac-Intosch in a 2–4 home loss against rivals Heerenveen. On 3 March 2019, he equalized after an assist from Michael Pinto in a 4–2 away loss against AZ. Having earned the trust of Sittard head coach Rene Eijer, Lamprou started most matches in the Eredivisie and stood out as the team’s main attacking threat. The 21-year-old has experienced a great season in the Netherlands with 24 appearances across all competitions and eight goals to his name, and consequently Lamprou is being heavily sought out by clubs from Portugal, Belgium, and the Netherlands, where he established himself this season.

On summer 2019, he returned to PAOK. On 23 December 2019, he made his debut for the 2018–19 season as a substitute in a 5–1 home win game against Atromitos. On 15 January 2020, he scored his first goal in the season, opening the scoring, powering into the penalty area from the right flank and lashing a fierce attempt into the roof of the net to give the lead to his club in a 4–1 home Greek Cup win game against OFI. On 19 January 2020, he scored his first goal in the Championship as the young Greek forward tapping in from close range following a slick passing move and yet another great assist from Josip Mišić, in a 3–1 home win game against Asteras Tripolis.

On 31 July 2020, Lamprou joined Eredivisie club Twente on loan from PAOK, with a purchase option for the summer of 2021. On 30 December 2020, his loan was cut short.

On 31 August 2021, he joined OFI on a season-long loan. On 28 November 2021, he scored his first goal of the season, with a penalty kick in the last minute of the game, sealing a vital 2-1 home win game against Ionikos F.C.
On 12 January 2022, he scored a brace helping his team seal an emphatic 3–0 win away win over Apollon Smyrni F.C.  He was voted man of the match for his performance.

Excelsior
On 31 August 2022, Lamprou signed a two-year contract with Excelsior in the Netherlands.

Career statistics

Club

Honours
PAOK 
Greek Cup: 2020–21

Individual
Eredivisie Talent of the Month: February 2019

References

External links

1997 births
Footballers from Katerini
Living people
Greek footballers
Association football wingers
Greece under-21 international footballers
Greece youth international footballers
Panathinaikos F.C. players
Iraklis Thessaloniki F.C. players
PAOK FC players
Panionios F.C. players
Fortuna Sittard players
FC Twente players
OFI Crete F.C. players
Excelsior Rotterdam players
Super League Greece players
Eredivisie players
Greek expatriate footballers
Expatriate footballers in the Netherlands
Greek expatriate sportspeople in the Netherlands